Ewansville or Ewanville is an unincorporated community located in Burlington County, New Jersey, United States. The community is centered on the crossing of U.S. Route 206 (US 206) and the North Branch Rancocas Creek just north of the former Philadelphia and Long Branch Railway (later Pennsylvania Railroad). Ewansville was the site of a station on the aforementioned railroad and was the terminus for a short spur track to Vincentown.

Ewansville is located near the tripoint of Eastampton, Pemberton, Southampton townships. Pemberton Township is situated north of the creek and east of US 206, Eastampton Township generally to the west of US 206, and Southampton comprises the remaining area. Some trailer parks line US 206 in this area but permanent houses are also located on nearby Railroad Avenue and Indian Trail.

Media
Ewansville is home to one FM radio station, 107.9 W300CZ, a translator for WPST. W300CZ is Ewansville's #1 Hit Music Station with a Top 40 format.

References

Eastampton Township, New Jersey
Pemberton Township, New Jersey
Southampton Township, New Jersey
Populated places in the Pine Barrens (New Jersey)
Unincorporated communities in Burlington County, New Jersey
Unincorporated communities in New Jersey